The Bob's Burgers Music Album is the soundtrack to American animated sitcom Bob's Burgers. It was released on May 12, 2017 via Sub Pop.

The album is composed of 112 songs, 107 of which are from the first six seasons of the show, performed by the main cast members (H. Jon Benjamin, John Roberts, Dan Mintz, Eugene Mirman and Kristen Schaal) and recurring/special guests like Aziz Ansari, Bill Hader, Carly Simon, Cyndi Lauper, Fred Armisen, Kevin Kline, Paul Rudd, Sarah Silverman and Zach Galifianakis. Five never-aired Bob's Buskers cover versions of songs from the show performed by The National, Låpsley, Stephin Merritt and St. Vincent.

Critical reception

The Bob's Burgers Music Album was met with generally positive reviews. At Metacritic, the album received an average score of 77, based on 7 reviews.

Rachel Bowles of The Skinny praised the album saying, "The LP manages to consistently surprise and entertain for its entire running time, just two minutes shy of two hours. Bob's Burgers' unique music provides an offbeat, aural soundscape to its narrative and allows for characters to express themselves". Heather Phares of AllMusic said, "The sheer size of The Bob's Burgers Music Album means that Gene Belcher might be the only one with the stamina to listen to the entire set more than once, but it's great for obsessive fans who can finally own the whole shebang". In his review for Clash, Sam Walker-Smart stated, "Much like the show itself this is a wonderfully crafted set (check out the deluxe ‘condiment’ vinyl), which is at times both smart, sweet and very, very, stupid". Pretty Much Amazing reviewer Daniel Bromfield said, "Bouchard really puts work into these tunes. He strives to make each one better than it really needs to be". The 405 reviewer stated, "Of course, at nearly two hours long, it’s probably not something you’ll listen to all in one go (especially if you’re not a Bob’s Burgers fan), but it’s quite easy to dip in and out of it at your leisure. If you like songs about butts and farts too, then you’re well catered for here". Eric Thurm of Pitchfork said, "It’s pitched almost entirely at “Bob’s” die-hards and listening to this album without being a fan of “Bob’s Burgers” is a fool’s errand. Even for fanatics, the two hours still feels like an ill-advised trek. The ease with which the soundtrack switches between novelty ditties and riot grrrl homage—a genre the show is most cozy with—is part of its draw".

In a mixed review, Record Collectors Mischa Pearlman stated: "Sadly, outside the context of the episodes, the actual ditties are only mildly humorous at best, and barely warrant more than one play through".

Commercial performance
Reaching a peak position of number twenty-one on the US Billboard 200, The Bob's Burgers Music Album remained on the chart for a total of two weeks. It also topped the Billboard Comedy Albums chart, reached number two spot on the Vinyl Albums and the Independent Albums, peaked at number three on the Top Soundtracks, and landed at number eight on Tastemakers chart.

Track listing

Personnel
Jeff Kleinsmith – creative director
Bernard Derriman – artwork, design
Derek Schroeder – artwork, layout
Tony Gennaro – artwork, layout
Anthony Aguinaldo – artwork
Maggie Harbaugh – artwork
Tyler Garrison – artwork
Kevin Bernier – artwork
Devin Roth – artwork
Jay Howell – artwork
Joe Healy – artwork
Phil Hayes – design

Charts

Weekly charts

Year-end charts

References

External links

2017 soundtrack albums
Sub Pop soundtracks